John Terry (c.1555–1625) was a Church of England clergyman and anti-Catholic controversialist.

Educated at New College, Oxford, he was elected a fellow of the college until taking the living of Stockton, Wiltshire in 1590. The Triall of Truth  attacked Roman Catholicism.

Works
The Triall of Truth, 1600
The second part of the trial of truth, 1602
The reasonablenesse of wise and holy truth, 1617
Theologicall Logicke: or the third part of the Tryall of truth, 1625

References
Stephen Wright, ‘Terry, John (c.1555–1625)’, Oxford Dictionary of National Biography, Oxford University Press, 2004, accessed 20 Dec 2007

External links

1550s births
1625 deaths
Alumni of New College, Oxford
Fellows of New College, Oxford
English non-fiction writers
English Protestants
16th-century Protestants
17th-century English Anglican priests
English religious writers
16th-century English writers
16th-century male writers
17th-century English writers
17th-century English male writers
English male non-fiction writers